Susan Shantz, (born 1957) is a Canadian sculptor. Her work is often described as spiritual and feminist. She currently resides in Saskatoon, Saskatchewan.

Shantz has worked with a variety of sculptural media, including twigs, ash, found objects, tomato paste, and 3D printed thermoplastic prints. Photographs of her selected works are available at the CCCA Canadian Art Database.

Themes in her work include dormancy, consumption, patterns of nature and translation.

Early life and education

Shantz has an undergraduate degree in English from Goshen College, a Master of Arts degree in Religion and Culture from Wilfrid Laurier University, and a Master of Arts degree in Sculpture and Interdisciplinary Studies from York University.

Career
Shantz taught at both York University and Wilfrid Laurier University in Ontario and held a number of solo exhibits. She moved to Saskatoon in 1990 to work at the University of Saskatchewan, where she continued to exhibit. In 1996 she took part in an outdoor sculpture project at the Southern Alberta Art Gallery.

Shantz is a Professor in Sculpture and Extended Media at the University of Saskatchewan and she was the Department Head of Art and Art History from 2007-2013.

Shantz has received grants from the Canada Council, the Saskatchewan Arts Board, the British Columbia Arts Council and the Ontario Arts Council.

She has also written on the topics of spirituality in art and quilt-making.

Further reading

The ARTSask webpage on Susan Shantz includes videos on her artistic process.

References

1957 births
Living people
Artists from Ontario
Artists from Saskatoon
Canadian sculptors
20th-century Canadian women artists
21st-century Canadian women artists